Chad Roque Santos (born April 28, 1981) is a former Major League Baseball first baseman. He bats and throws left-handed.

Santos was drafted by the Kansas City Royals in the 22nd round of the 1999 Major League Baseball Draft. He had three hits, one a home run, in three games, in his one-year career.

External links

1981 births
Living people
Major League Baseball first basemen
Baseball players from Hawaii
Gulf Coast Royals players
Charleston AlleyCats players
Burlington Bees players
Peoria Javelinas players
Spokane Indians players
Wilmington Blue Rocks players
Wichita Wranglers players
Omaha Royals players
San Jose Giants players
Fresno Grizzlies players
San Francisco Giants players